Dortmund-Körne West station is a railway station in the Dortmund district of Körne in the German state of North Rhine-Westphalia. It is classified by Deutsche Bahn as a category 6 station. It was opened on 3 June 1984 on the Welver–Sterkrade railway completed between Welver and the old Dortmund Süd (south) station by the Royal Westphalian Railway Company on 15 May 1876 and electrified on 25 May 1984.

It is served by Rhine-Ruhr S-Bahn line S 4 at 30-minute intervals (15-minute intervals in the peak between Dortmund-Lütgendortmund and ).

It is also served by bus route 422 (Wambel – Brackel – Aplerbeck – Schüren) every 30 minutes, operated by DSW21.

References 

S4 (Rhine-Ruhr S-Bahn)
Rhine-Ruhr S-Bahn stations
Railway stations in Dortmund
Railway stations in Germany opened in 1984